Zapotlanejo is a town and municipality in the Mexican state of Jalisco.

According to the 2020 census, there were 63,634 inhabitants in the municipality.  The municipality has a territorial extension of 643.02 km2.

Toponymy
Zapotlanejo is a hybrid word, half Nahuatl and half Spanish.  The Nahuatl word "Sapote" (from Nahuatl tzapotl) is a term for a soft, edible fruit and "tlan" (place).  In addition, the name of the municipality includes the Spanish ending indicating locality "ejo."

Climate

History
The town of Zapotlán was previously known as Zapotlán de los Tecuexes, alluding to the name of its pre-Hispanic inhabitants, the Tecuexes, who established themselves in the area about 1218.

Spanish settlement in the area began around 1523.  The area's Spanish settlers were subject to continuous attacks by Chichimec forces during the early colonial period.

The municipality's famous Bridge of Calderón was constructed during the government of Francisco Calderón Romero (1670–1672).  The bridge was the site of the Battle of the Bridge of Calderón in 1811, which was a key battle in the Mexican War of Independence.

In 1860, republican troops led by General Ignacio Zaragoza defeated Leonardo Márquez near the town as he fled from Tepatitlán.

In 1824, Zapotlanejo was made capital of the Department of Tonalá.  In 1825, the town was made part of the first canton of Jalisco (Guadalajara).  In 1887, Zapotlanejo was part of the fourth department of the first canton of the state.  The community was afforded status as a municipality by decree of April 8, 1844.

The Dos Lunas Tequila brand is produced just outside town.

Government

Municipal presidents

Twin towns – sister cities

Zapotlanejo is twinned with:
 Chanco, Chile
 Racine, United States
 San Antonio de los Baños, Cuba

External links
  Zapotlanejo, Jalisco Mexico, La Cuna del Vestir!--- Deja que el mundo te conozca! 
  ::Zapotlanejo::

References

Municipalities of Jalisco